William A. Maguire (born 1959) is an Irish historian.

Selected publications
 A Century in Focus: Photography and Photographers in the North of Ireland 
 Belfast: A History (Carnegie publishing)
 Kings in Conflict: The Revolutionary War in Ireland and Its Aftermath, 1689-1750 
 Up in Arms! 1798 Rebellion in Ireland - Record of a Bicentenary Exhibition in the Ulster Museum 
 Living Like A Lord: The Second Marquis Of Donegall 1769-1844 
 Georgian Belfast, 1750-1850: Maps, Buildings and Trades

References

External links
Listing at Goodreads

20th-century Irish historians
21st-century Irish historians
1959 births
Living people